Virginie was a French language Canadian television series that aired from 1996 through 2010.

Virginie may also refer to:

 Virginie (given name), a French feminine given name
 Virginie (film), a 1962 French comedy film
 Virginie-class frigate, a type of seven 44-gun frigates of the French Navy
 French frigate Virginie (1794), a 44-gun frigate of the French Navy
 Paul et Virginie , a novel by Jacques-Henri Bernardin de Saint-Pierre, first published in 1788

See also 
 Carry Me Back to Old Virginny, a 19th century American song